Stenoptilia pinkeri is a moth of the family Pterophoridae. It is known from Turkey.

The wingspan is 16–24 mm.

External links
Federmotten aus der Mongolei, Russland, der Türkei, der Balkanhalbinsel und Afrika, mit Beschreibung neuer Arten (Microlepidoptera: Pterophoridae)
Neue palaearktische Pterophoridae (Lep., Pterophoridae, Platyptiliinae)

pinkeri
Endemic fauna of Turkey
Moths described in 1984
Moths of Asia